Linda Johnson (born October 14, 1953) is an American professional poker player, journalist and consultant, based in Las Vegas, Nevada.  She was inducted into the Poker Hall of Fame in 2011.

Early life
Linda Johnson was born in Long Island, New York.  Before becoming involved in poker, Johnson worked for the United States Postal Service and traveled to Las Vegas regularly to play blackjack.  Her father, a career service member, convinced her that playing poker was the best way to gamble as it was not played against the house.

Poker playing career
Johnson began playing poker in 1974 and won a World Series of Poker (WSOP) bracelet in 1997 in the $1,500 seven-card razz event.

She also appeared in the Poker Royale: Comedians vs. Pros series.

, her total live tournament winnings exceed $300,000.

Other poker activities

Johnson is known as "The First Lady of Poker", a phrase coined by Mike Sexton due to her lengthy association with the game, in particular the World Poker Tour (WPT) as she explains in the Ladies Night episode of WPT Season 6.

She worked as the publisher of CardPlayer Magazine for eight years, before selling the company to Barry Shulman. However, she still writes articles for the magazine. She also set up the Tournament Directors Association (TDA), which sets common rules for tournaments such as the WPT. She continues to be involved with the TDA by serving on the Board of Directors.

Johnson was one of the founders of the World Poker Tour and was the announcer to the studio audience for its first six seasons. In addition, she is a partner in Card Player Cruises.

In 2009, Johnson helped found PokerGives.org, a nonprofit organization that makes it easier for poker players to donate to charity.

On Monday, February 27, 2017, the World Poker Tour awarded Ms. Linda Johnson with the inaugural WPT Honors Award, representing outstanding contributions to the WPT and the greater poker community. “We are proud to present Linda Johnson with the inaugural WPT Honors Award,” said Adam Pliska, CEO of the World Poker Tour. “The award represents WPT’s highest honor and will serve as a lasting tradition that allows us to recognize the most important people in our industry and in the WPT’s history. Linda played a unique role in helping shape the World Poker Tour, and she embodies all that the WPT stands for."

References

External links
 Interview with Linda Johnson and Jan Fisher
 PokerPages Interview
 PokerCoaching Interview
 PartTimePoker Interview
 PokerPages profile
 WPT management profile
 Card Player Cruises
 Tournament Directors Association
 Hendon Mob tournament results
 PokerGives.org
 World Poker Tour honors Linda Johnson

American poker players
World Series of Poker bracelet winners
American gambling writers
1953 births
Living people
Female poker players
Poker Hall of Fame inductees